Gregory Donald Edgecombe  is a merit researcher in the department of Earth Sciences at the Natural History Museum, London. He is a leading figure in understanding the evolution of arthropods, their position in animal evolution and the integration of fossil data into analyses of animal phylogeny. As a palaeontologist, he is also an authority on the systematics of centipedes – and a morphologist whose work contributes to the growth and methods of analysis of molecular datasets for inferring evolutionary relationships.

Education
Edgecombe was educated at Columbia University where he received a PhD in 1991 for systematic studies on the trilobite order Phacopida supervised by Niles Eldredge at the American Museum of Natural History.

Career and research
After his PhD, Edgecombe was a postdoctoral researcher at the University of Alberta, and worked as a researcher at the Australian Museum in Sydney for 14 years. In 2007 he took up the position of research leader at the Natural History Museum, London, where since 2013 he has been a Natural Environment Research Council (NERC) merit researcher. With Gonzalo Giribet, he co-authored a textbook, The Invertebrate Tree of Life, published by Princeton University Press in March 2020.

Awards and honours
Edgecombe was awarded the president's medal by the Palaeontological Association in 2011 and the Fenner Medal for distinguished research in biology by the Australian Academy of Science in 2004. He was elected a Fellow of the Royal Society (FRS) in 2018.

References

Living people
Fellows of the Royal Society
Year of birth missing (living people)
Columbia University alumni
Paleontologists
Employees of the Natural History Museum, London
Place of birth missing (living people)